Eglinton Square Shopping Centre is an enclosed shopping mall in Toronto, Ontario, Canada, located at Eglinton Avenue East and Victoria Park Avenue in Scarborough's Golden Mile neighbourhood. It opened in 1954 as a strip plaza, like most retail space at the time, and was later converted to mall. It was notable for having a parking garage attached to Morgans department store, with a steep winding ramp. Morgan's was bought by the Hudson's Bay Company and eventually became a Bay. The garage was demolished. The main shopping centre still has two 1960s style ramps that provide two levels of parking on top of the stores. The top most level is the roof of the building and also provides open air parking spaces.

It is owned by Kingsett Capital and under the management of Bentall Kennedy (Canada) LP. The mall is located on what was once the site of James Neilson's farm.

The shopping centre is slated for major redevelopment, with high density condo buildings as part of the mix, due to the Eglinton Crosstown LRT that is being built along Eglinton Avenue.

History
The mall was opened to the public in 1954 in an area once settled by farmland in the 1820s and re-developed as industrial land during World War II along Eglinton Avenue and surrounded by residential homes to the north, south and west sides.

The mall's perimeter is being redeveloped for residential use (condo towers and townhouses) including demolition of existing low rise apartments along Engelhart Crescent.

See also
 List of shopping malls in Toronto

External links
Official website

Shopping malls in Toronto
Buildings and structures in Scarborough, Toronto
Shopping malls established in 1954